Cius (Kios), later renamed Prusias on the Sea after king Prusias I of Bithynia, was an ancient Greek city bordering the Propontis (now known as the Sea of Marmara), in Bithynia and in Mysia (in modern northwestern Turkey), and had a long history, being mentioned by Herodotus, Xenophon, Aristotle, Strabo and Apollonius Rhodius.

Geography 
Cius was strategically placed at the head of a gulf in the Propontis, called the gulf of Cius, or Cianus Sinus. Herodotus calls it Cius of Mysia; and also Xenophon, from which it appears that Mysia, even in Xenophon's time, extended at least as far east as the head of the gulf of Cius. Pliny the Elder reports that Cius was a Milesian colony. It was at the foot of Mount Arganthonius, and there was a myth that Hylas, one of the companions of Heracles on the voyage to Colchis, was carried off by the nymphs when he went to get water here; and also that Cius, another companion of Heracles, on his return from Colchis, stayed here and founded the city, to which he gave his name. Pliny mentions a river Hylas and a river Cius here, one of which reminds us of the name of the youth who was stolen by the nymphs, and the other of the mythical founder. The Cius may be the channel by which the lake Ascania discharges its waters into the gulf of Cius; though Pliny speaks of the Ascanium flumen as flowing into the gulf, and we must assume that he gives this name to the channel which connects the lake and the sea. If the river Cius is not identical with this channel, it must be a small stream near Cius. As Ptolemy speaks of the outlets of the Ascanius, it has been conjectured that there may have been two, and that they may be the Hylas and Cius of Pliny; but the plural ἐκβολαί does not necessarily mean more than a single mouth; and Pliny certainly says that the Ascanius flows into the gulf. However, his geography is a constant cause of difficulty. The position of Cius made it the port for the inland parts, and it became a place of much commercial importance. Pomponius Mela calls it the most convenient emporium of Phrygia, which was at no great distance from it.

History 
Cius was taken by the Persians, after the burning of Sardis, in 499 BC. It joined the Aetolian League, and was destroyed by Philip V of Macedon in the Second Macedonian War (200-197), and given by him to Prusias I of Bithynia. Prusias, who had assisted Philip in ruining Cius, restored it under the name of Prusias (Προυσιάς). It was sometimes called Prusias ἐπιθαλασσίη, or "on the sea," to distinguish it from other towns of the same name, or πρὸς θάλασσαν. In the text of Memnon the reading is Cierus; but Memnon, both in this and other passages, has confounded Cius and Cierus. But it is remarked that Cius must either have still existed by the side of the new city, or must have recovered its old name; for Pliny mentions Cius, and also Mela, Zosimus, and writers of a still later date. It was a member of the Delian League.

It was an important chain in the ancient Silk Road and became known as a wealthy town.

Coins 

There are coins of Cius, with the legend Κιανων, belonging to the Roman imperial period; and there are coins of Prusias with the epigraph, Προυσιεων των προς θαλασσαν.

Bishopric 
Cius became an early Christian bishopric. Its bishop, Cyrillus, took part in the First Council of Nicaea in 325, and Theosebius attended the Council of Ephesus. The names of many of his successors in the first millennium are known from extant contemporary documents. At first a suffragan of Nicomedia, it soon became an autocephalous archdiocese, being listed as such in Notitiae Episcopatuum from the 7th century onward. No longer a residential bishopric, Cius is today listed by the Catholic Church as a titular see.

Modern history
Following the population exchange in 1923, the Greek refugees from Cius established the town of Nea Kios, in Argolis, Greece and the village of Paralia, in Pieria, Greece. There are only few remnants of the ancient town and its harbour today. Somewhat more to the west, the new modern town of Gemlik, Bursa Province, Turkey is found.

See also 
 List of ancient Greek cities

Notes

References
Richard Talbert, Barrington Atlas of the Greek and Roman World, p. 52.

External links
Hazlitt, Classical Gazetteer, "Cius"
Kios (Gemlik) - The Greek City in Asia Minor
Catholic Encuclopedia - Cius

Populated places in Bithynia
Populated places in ancient Mysia
Greek colonies in Bithynia
Locations in Greek mythology
Catholic titular sees in Asia
Milesian colonies
Populated places along the Silk Road
Ancient Greek archaeological sites in Turkey
Ruins in Turkey
Former populated places in Turkey
History of Bursa Province
Geography of Bursa Province
Roman fortifications in Roman Asia
Members of the Delian League